The following is a list of Sites of Special Scientific Interest in the Nithsdale Area of Search. For other areas, see List of SSSIs by Area of Search.

 Back Wood
 Black Loch
 Carron Water and Hapland Burn
 Chanlockfoot
 Coshogle Wood
 Kirkconnell Flow
 Lag Meadow
 Lagrae Burn
 Leadhills-Wanlockhead
 Locharbriggs Quarry
 Longbridge Muir
 Mennock Water
 North Lowther Uplands
 Polhote and Polneul Burns
 River Nith at Drumlanrig Bridge  De-notified (confirmed) on 17 November 2011
 Shiel Dod
 Stenhouse Wood
 Tynron Juniper Wood
 Upper Solway Flats and Marshes

 
Nithsdale